Clark Thomas "Shorty" Templeman (August 12, 1919 in Pueblo, Colorado – August 24, 1962 in Marion, Ohio) was an American racecar driver.

Championship car
He drove in the AAA and USAC Championship Car series, racing in the 1954-1962 seasons with 42 starts, including the Indianapolis 500 races in 1955, 1958, and 1960–1962.  He finished in the top ten 16 times, with his best finish in 2nd position, in 1961 at both DuQuoin and Syracuse.  His best Indy finish was 4th in 1961.

Midget car
He won five Washington state and three Oregon midget state championships. Templeman won all three Night Before the 500 midget car features at the 16th Street Speedway in Indianapolis in 1956. Templeman won the first three USAC National Midget Series champions when he won titles in 1956, 1957, and 1958.

Templeman died as a result of injuries sustained in a midget car crash at the Marion County, Ohio Fairgrounds track.

Career awards
He was inducted in the National Sprint Car Hall of Fame in 1984.
He was inducted in the National Midget Auto Racing Hall of Fame in the inaugural class of 1984.

Indianapolis 500 results

World Championship career summary
The Indianapolis 500 was part of the FIA World Championship from 1950 through 1960. Drivers competing at Indy during those years were credited with World Championship points and participation. Shorty Templeman participated in 3 World Championship races but scored no World Championship points.

References

1919 births
1962 deaths
Indianapolis 500 drivers
Racing drivers who died while racing
National Sprint Car Hall of Fame inductees
Sports deaths in Ohio
Sportspeople from Pueblo, Colorado
Racing drivers from Colorado
AAA Championship Car drivers